Peckham Platform (formerly called Peckham Space) is a public art gallery in London that commissions and exhibits work by contemporary artists, usually in collaboration with local community groups.

History

Peckham Platform was founded in 2009 as an initiative developed by nearby Camberwell College of Arts to commission location-specific projects by contemporary artists in collaboration with local youth groups. The first brand new, purpose-built, public-funded art gallery in South London since 1891, the building was designed by the architects Penson Group and is located on Peckham Square in the Peckham district of South London. Funders for the new venture, originally called 'Peckham Space', included Arts Council England  and Southwark Council, as well as UAL. In 2013, the gallery became independent from Camberwell College of Arts, changing its name and, through the formation of a Board of Trustees, established itself as a charitable institution.
Peckham Platform's founding director is Emily Druiff, whose earlier career as a curator and artist was focussed on the field of socially engaged art in London.

Exhibitions
Since its founding in 2009, Peckham Platform has established a programme of commissioning new work for solo exhibitions by British and international artists. These have included installation artist Gayle Chong Kwan ('Double Vision', in 2012), filmmakers Sonia Boyce ('Network' in 2011) and Nikolaj Bendix Skyum Larsen (343 Perspectives in 2012), painter Kimathi Donkor (Daddy, I want to be a black artist, in 2013), performance artist Jessica Voorsanger (Peckham Heroes, in 2011) and Ruth Beale, whose 2014 show 'Bookbed' helped relaunch the gallery under its new name. All of the gallery's exhibitions have involved artistic collaborations with local community groups and residents, particularly young people – in line with the institution's mission to build creative links between contemporary art and the community.

Education and Youth
Integral to Peckham Platform's exhibition programme is its work in public art education. As well as the educational workshops, artist's talks and seminars which are a standard element in the public gallery sector, Peckham Platform is distinctive and innovative in London because of its policy of consistently commissioning artists to make work directly in collaboration with members of the local community, particularly young people facing the challenges of inequality in one of London's most deprived urban areas.

Governance
Peckham Platform has charitable status under UK law and is governed by a Board of Trustees.

References

External links
Official website for Peckham Platform

Arts centres in London
2009 establishments in England
Contemporary art galleries in London
Buildings and structures in the London Borough of Southwark
Tourist attractions in the London Borough of Southwark
Art galleries established in 2009
Peckham